Can't Hold Back or I Can't Hold Back may refer to:

Can't Hold Back (Pure Prairie League album), 1979
Can't Hold Back (Eddie Money album), 1986, includes the song "I Can't Hold Back"
"Can't Hold Back" (song), a 2009 song by Kaz James featuring Macy Gray
 "Can't Hold Back", a song by Anton Ewald
"I Can't Hold Back", a 1984 song by Survivor
 "Can't Hold Back (Your Lovin')", a 1982 song by Kano